Levers Pacific Plantations Ltd. was a British company incorporated in 1902, by William Lever, in London, as a subsidiary of Lever Brothers which wanted to get more control on raw materials like copra for its soap, mainly for Lever Brothers Factory. His first general manager was G. Foulton based in Sydney. In 1903 the company was granted access to copra and phosphate reserves in the Pacific.

References

British companies established in 1902
Defunct companies based in London